Paracymoriza prodigalis is a moth in the family Crambidae. It was described by John Henry Leech in 1889. It is found in China (Hebei, Zhejiang, Fujian, Henan, Hubei, Guangdong, Sichuan, Guizhou), Taiwan, Korea and Japan.

References

Acentropinae
Moths described in 1889